The 1870 Colchester by-election was held on 3 November 1870.  The byelection was fought due to the death of the incumbent Liberal MP, John Gurdon Rebow.

The Liberal candidate was Sir Henry Storks, a strong supporter of the controversial Contagious Diseases Acts which provided for compulsory inspection and medical treatment of prostitutes in garrison towns, including Colchester. Opponents of the legislation, including Josephine Butler, supported a rival Liberal Baxter Langley, and used the election in their campaign for repeal. Langley withdrew on election day and the Conservative candidate Alexander Learmonth of Edinburgh, gained the seat convincingly.  The gain was retained at the subsequent general election.

References

1870 in England
Politics of Colchester
1870 elections in the United Kingdom
By-elections to the Parliament of the United Kingdom in Essex constituencies
1870s in Essex